Dry gas is an alcohol-based additive gas used in automobiles to prevent water from freezing in water-contaminated fuels and to restore combustive power to gasoline spoiled by water. Dry gas is added to the fuel tank and binds to the water to burn it off and typically contains either methanol or isopropyl alcohol.

Ethanol as a replacement for dry gas 
Most gasoline now contains around 10-15% ethanol solution. Current gasoline-powered automobiles can safely run up to a 10% ethanol solution without modification. However, at 15% or above, older vehicles may require replacing the fuel lines to prevent degradation and rupture. In this case, the electric fuel pump may also need modification to prevent ethanol "dry rot."

The belief that dry gas is not needed because of the significant amount of ethanol present in fuel is mostly true, as Ethanol is a drying agent that has an affinity for water present in the atmosphere. It binds to the fuel tank's moisture, reducing issues with freezing fuel lines. Adding dry gas lowers the freezing point of the water and alcohol mixture to a lower level than what ethanol can produce, causing fuel lines to become freeze resistant.

References

Fuel additives
Automotive fuel retailers